Um Show de Verão is a 2004 Brazilian comedy film directed by Moacyr Góes

Plot
Andréa (Angelica) is a humble carrier of telemarketing. Her boyfriend, Fred (Thiago Fragoso), is a typical businessman's son who thinks he can do anything in life. He decides to turn his girlfriend into a successful singer, with the help of his friend Marcelo (Luciano Huck), who always dreamed of being a music producer. From there, Andrea and Marcelo are to live several adventures the world of music and show biz. Until one night, there is a passion between the two that can knock you out.

The film includes appearances by several Brazilian artists and bands such as Felix Da Housecat, Peter Sun, Gabriel o Pensador, Lulu Santos DJ Marlboro, Capital Inicial, Detonautas, among others.

Cast
Angélica .... Andréa
Luciano Huck .... Marcelo
Thiago Fragoso .... Fred
Tonico Pereira .... Mr. Cisco
Letícia Colin ... sister Fred
Viétia Zangrandi...Leide
Márcia Cabrita .... Lupe
Ingrid Guimarães .... Jaqueline
José Mojica Marins (Zé do Caixão) .... Josefel
Eliana Fonseca .... Mrs. Jacira
Carol Castro .... Salete Keli
Sérgio Hondjakoff .... Marcelo friend
Cláudio Gabriel .... researcher
Isio Ghelman .... father of Fred
Malu Valle .... mother of Fred
Debby Lagranha .... Laura
Lui Mendes .... Jeandro
Renata Pitanga .... Secretary of Jaqueline
Leon Góes .... manager hellhole
Carol Castro .... "Maid of Hellraiser"
Íris Bustamante .... seller store
Tony Tornado .... menacing
Marcos Mion .... Welmer
Dany Bananinha .... Monique
Otavio Mesquita .... Pizza delivery

Soundtrack
 Um Show de Verão - Angélica
 Futuro Azul - Angélica
 O Show Tem Que Continuar (tema instrumental)
 Chega de Dogma - Lulu Santos
 Do Seu Lado - Jota Quest
 Amor Maior - Jota Quest
 220 Volts - Capital Inicial
 Quatro Vezes Você - Capital Inicial
 Incondicionalmente - Capital Inicial
 Podes Crer - Cidade Negra
 Cachimbo da Paz - Gabriel o Pensador
 Ei, Peraê! - Detonautas
 Não Sei Viver Sem Ter Você - CPM 22
 Sessão da Tarde - Pedro Sol
 Deixa Disso - Felipe Dylon
 Cabeça de Cera - Superfly
 Imperfeito - Superfly
 Falsidade - MC Andinho
 Eu Quero - DJ Marlboro
 Quando Eles Dormem - Poesia de Gaia
 Sonhos e Planos - CPM 22

See also

Brazilian cinema

External links
Imagem do filme Um show de verão

2004 films
2004 comedy films
2000s Portuguese-language films
Films set in Brazil
Brazilian comedy films